Glen Philip Hart (born July 31, 1946) is a Canadian provincial politician. He was a Saskatchewan Party member of the Legislative Assembly of Saskatchewan and represented the constituency of Last Mountain-Touchwood from 1999 to 2020. He chaired the Standing Committee on Human Services as well as participating in the Caucus Human Services Standing Policy Committee, and served as deputy speaker of the assembly from 2011 to 2020. His career has included many managerial positions in both provincial and federal government. Aside from representing Last Mountain-Touchwood, he also ran the family farm.

References

External links
Biography at the Legislative Assembly of Saskatchewan
MLA Website

Living people
Saskatchewan Party MLAs
1946 births
21st-century Canadian politicians